The Anahuac was a short-lived United States automobile styled after a contemporary Polish car and manufactured in 1922 in Indianapolis by the Frontenac Motor Corporation  Intended for the export market (it was to have been marketed in Mexico by a Mexican concern), the car had a wheelbase of ; only four were ever completed.

Vintage vehicles
Defunct motor vehicle manufacturers of the United States